In category theory, an abstract mathematical discipline, a nodal decomposition of a morphism  is a representation of  as a product , where  is a strong epimorphism,  a bimorphism, and  a strong monomorphism.

Uniqueness and notations  
 If it exists, the nodal decomposition is unique up to an isomorphism in the following sense: for any two  nodal decompositions  and  there exist isomorphisms  and  such that 
 
 
 

 
This property justifies some special notations for the elements of the nodal decomposition: 
 

In these notations the nodal decomposition takes the form

Connection with the basic decomposition in pre-abelian categories  
In a pre-abelian category  each morphism  has a standard decomposition 
 ,

Categories with nodal decomposition  

In an abelian category  the basic decomposition
 
is always nodal. As a corollary, all abelian categories have nodal decomposition. 

If a pre-abelian category  is linearly complete, well-powered in strong monomorphisms and co-well-powered in strong epimorphisms, then   has nodal decomposition.

The category Ste of stereotype spaces (being non-abelian) has nodal decomposition, as well as the (non-additive) category SteAlg of stereotype algebras .

Notes

References 

Category theory